Qomrud (also Romanized as Qomrūd and Qumrūd) is a village in and seat of Qomrud Rural District, in the Central District of Qom County, Qom Province, Iran. At the 2006 census, its population was 1,922, in 443 families, making it the most populous village in Qom Province.

People 
The village was located in the village of Qummud and according to the 2006 census it was 1,922 (443 households). [1] 70% of the village population is Turkic languages, 5-10% of the Afghan population and 20% to 25% of it are Persian languages.

History and culture 
In general, the Qomrood area is one of the world's most populated places and places of transport for human beings in the BCE. It contains various historical monuments in different historical periods (scattered in the region), which include works such as Qarat-e-Tappeh Qamroud is evidence of this

Large areas of Iran have ancient civilizations. Qamrood area is one of those areas that retained elements from the days of the early period of civilization's presence. The first ancient prayers on the Iranian plateau were made in this area. Some historians have attributed the original construction of this area to Alexander, Bohram Gore, Tahmurth, Lhrassap, Ghobad Sassanid, Yazdgerd III, and several others, and there are disagreements over this. Archaeologists such as Roman Cirsman consider Qom to be the oldest region in which human beings have settled there and have established the first civilizations. New archaeological results also date the Qomrud region more than 7,000 years ago. Archaeologists claim that due to the existence of the Qamrood River and the presence of the Shah, the roadway of the Silk Road has been the source of civilizations since the early days of history. In the region, about 130 ancient works, mostly belonging to the Sassanid and Parthian era, have been identified.

Economy 
The job of the people of Qomroud rural district is often agricultural and part of the population is also engaged in animal husbandry. This rural district is one of the most important agricultural and livestock fields of Qom province. In the past, a large part of agricultural agriculture in this village was provided by qanat and Qomrood river, but Time lapse and rainfall reduction, and by the construction of the dam of 15 Khordad in the south of the river, farmers have been stopped by the river and today they are supplied with agricultural aquifers.

The products of this village are often barley and alfalfa, but in recent decades pistachio planting has grown strongly in this village, and most farmers have turned to gardening with drought-resistant trees and over the past few years wheat has been cultivated Almost entirely out of the agricultural industry of this village.

In recent years, women in this village have turned to home-based businesses, and home-based businesses have become widespread in the Qomroud region.

References 

Qom County
Populated places in Qom Province